There follows a list of equipment used by the Philippine National Police.

Vehicles

Aircraft

Watercraft

Weapons

References

Equipment
Law enforcement equipment